Ghanem Bashir (Arabic:غانم بشير) (born 11 November 1986) is an Emirati footballer. He currently plays as a defender .

References

External links
 

Emirati footballers
1986 births
Living people
Al Ahli Club (Dubai) players
Al-Ittihad Kalba SC players
Al-Wasl F.C. players
Baniyas Club players
Sharjah FC players
Association football defenders
UAE Pro League players